Ghanam Mohamed is an Egyptian professional footballer who plays for Egyptian Premier League side Future FC as a center midfielder.

Biography 
Ghanam Mohamed was born on  March 12, 1997 in Egypt. He started his football career at  Al Ahly. In 2017, he was transferred to El Gouna. In 2018, he was transferred to El Entag El- Harby and in 2021 he was transferred to Future FC. In general, he has over one hundred appearances across all competitions including his appearance at the 2019 Africa U-23 Cup of Nations.

Trophies 
He won the 2019 Africa U-23 Cup of Nations and the 2020/2021 EFA League Cup with the Future FC.

References 

Egyptian Premier League players
1997 births
Living people